Beachcomber... By the Way was a radio programme that aired from March 1989 to December 1994. There were 18 half-hour episodes and it was broadcast on BBC Radio 4, and was later rerun on BBC Radio 7.  It starred Richard Ingrams, John Wells, Patricia Routledge, John Sessions and Brian Perkins.

The programme was based on the long-running humorous column "By the Way" in the Daily Express, written by J. B. Morton under the pseudonym "Beachcomber".

Episodes

Series one

Series two

Series three

Notes and references
Lavalie, John. "Beachcomber By the Way." EpGuides. 21 Jul 2005. 29 Jul 2005.
BBC Radio programme website

BBC Radio comedy programmes
BBC Radio 4 programmes